UNAP may refer to:
 Universidad Nacional del Altiplano de Puno (1856).
 United Nurses and Allied Professionals
 Universidad Nacional de la Amazonía Peruana (1961).
 Universidad Arturo Prat (1984).